Ntaoleng Patricia Peacock (born 2 February 1978) is a South African politician who has been a Member of the National Assembly since May 2019. Peacock is a member of the African National Congress.

Parliamentary career
Peacock is a member of the African National Congress. She was selected to represent the party in the National Assembly of South Africa following the general election held on 8 May 2019. She was sworn in as a Member of Parliament on 22 May 2019. On 27 June, she received her committee assignment.

Committee membership
Portfolio Committee on Police

References

External links
Profile at Parliament of South Africa

Living people
1978 births
African National Congress
Members of the National Assembly of South Africa
Women members of the National Assembly of South Africa
21st-century South African politicians
People from the Northern Cape